The following is a list of works by Bede.

Bede's list of his works
At the end of Bede's most famous work, the Historia ecclesiastica gentis Anglorum, Bede lists his works.  His list includes several books that have not survived to the present day; it also omits a few works of his which he either omitted or which he wrote after he finished the Historia.  His list follows, with an English translation given; the title used to describe the work in this article is also given, for easier reference.

In addition, the following works are listed below but are not mentioned by Bede:
 De Locis Sanctis
 Letter to Albinus
 Letter to Egbert
 De die iudicii
 A poem in thirteen couplets
 Paenitentiale Bedae

Works

Biblical commentaries
Commentary on Acts

Description: Completed shortly after 709.
Latin titles: One of the two books referred to in Bede's list as In actus apostolorum libros II
Editions:
ed. Laistner

Retractation

Description: Probably completed between 725 and 731.
Latin titles: One of the two books referred to in Bede's list as In actus apostolorum libros II
Editions:
ed. Laistner

Commentary on the Apocalypse

Description: Completed between 702 and 709.
Latin titles: Explanatio Apocalypsis (also Expositio Apocalypseos). Described in Bede's list as In apocalypsin sancti Iohannis libros III
Editions:
ed. Roger Gryson. Bedae presbyteri Expositio Apocalypseos. CCSL 121A. Bedae Opera 2:5. Turnhout: Brepols, 2001.

Commentary on the Catholic Epistles

Description: One of these seven commentaries (on John I) is known to have been completed at the same time as the Commentary on Acts, which was completed shortly after 709.  It is possible that the commentaries were not all completed at the same time.
Latin titles: Described in Bede's list as In epistolas VII catholicas libros singulos
Editions:

Collectaneum on the Pauline Epistles

Description:
Latin titles: Described in Bede's list as In apostolum quaecumque in opusculis sancti Augustini exposita inveni, cuncta per ordinem transscribere curavi
Editions: In Migne's Patrology, a work by Florus on the Pauline Epistles was printed as by Bede; the error was subsequently recognized but no edition of this work of Bede's has yet been printed.

Commentary on Ezra and Nehemiah

Description: Composed between 725 and 731.
Latin titles: Described in Bede's list as In Ezram et Neemiam libros II
Editions:

Commentary on Genesis

This exists in two forms; an early version in two books, and a later, revised version in four books. The work comments on the first twenty chapters of Genesis and the first ten verses of the twenty-first chapter.

Commentary on the Prayer of Habakkuk

It is not known when Bede composed this commentary. Bede dedicated the work to "his dearly beloved sister and virgin of Christ", but gives no further clues to the dedicatee's identity.  Bede's commentary draws on the work of Jerome and on Augustine's City of God.

Commentary on Luke

Description: Composed between 709 and 716.
Latin titles: Described in Bede's list as In evangelium Lucae libros VI
Editions:

Commentary on Mark

Description: Composed after 716.
Latin titles: Described in Bede's list as In evangelium Marci libros IIII
Editions:

Commentary on Proverbs

Description: The date of composition of this work cannot be fixed, though it is likely to have been composed at about the same time as the Commentary on the Song of Songs.
Latin titles: Described in Bede's list as In proverbia salomonis libros III.  Also appears in some manuscripts as In parabolas Salomonis, or Super parabolas Salomonis.
Editions:

Quaestiones XXX

Description: The date of composition of this work cannot be fixed; Laistner suggests that it is similar in style to Bede's later biblical commentaries and may have been composed in about 725.  The work consists of answers to thirty questions posed by Nothhelm to Bede on passages from I and II Samuel, and I and II Kings.
Latin titles: Described in Bede's list as In regum librum quaestiones XXX.  Also appears in some manuscripts as In parabolas Salomonis, or Super parabolas Salomonis.
Editions:

Commentary on Samuel

Description: The first three books were written by June 716, when Abbot Ceolfrith departed for Rome; the fourth book was begun after Ceolfrith's successor, Hwaetberht, had been appointed.
Latin titles: Described in Bede's list as In primam partem Samuhelis, id est usque ad mortem Saulis libros IIII.
Editions:

Commentary on the Song of Songs

Description: This work, one of Bede's longest, consists of an introduction on Divine Grace; five books of commentary on the Song of Songs; and a final section of extracts from the works of Gregory the Great. It is not known when any of these parts were composed.
Latin titles: Described in Bede's list as In cantica canticorum librum VII.
Editions:

De tabernaculo

Description: The date of composition is uncertain but is likely to have been around 721, or perhaps shortly thereafter.
Latin titles: Described in Bede's list as De tabernaculo et vasis eius ac vestibus sacerdotum, libros III.
Editions:

De templo Salomonis

Composed not long before 731. This work discusses the passage in 1 Kings 3:1 to 7:51 in which Solomon builds a temple.  Bede was here extending a long tradition of commentary on the temple in patristic literature.

Commentary on Tobit

Laistner suggests that this may have been written at about the same time as De templo Salmonis, since in both Bede stresses allegorical interpretation; however, he comments that there is no textual evidence to support this. There is no other indication of the date of composition.  As with the commentary on Habakkuk, Bede draws on the work of Jerome and on Augustine's City of God.

Geography
De Locis Sanctis

Description: Probably composed before 709; the dates of 702–703 have been suggested and seem likely to be correct.
Latin titles: Not mentioned by Bede in his list of his works.
Editions:

Hagiography
Life of St. Anastasius

There are no surviving manuscripts of this work, though one did survive as late as the 15th century.

Life of St. Felix

An adaptation into prose of four poems on St Felix by Paulinus of Nola.

Life of St. Cuthbert (verse)

Bede wrote two lives of St Cuthbert; this one is in verse and was probably composed between 705 and 716. The first printed edition was by Canisius, in his Antiquae Lectiones, which appeared between 1601 and 1604. Laistner lists twenty manuscripts, including one fragment; a 20th-century edition that includes a discussion of nineteen of the manuscripts is Werner Jaager, Bedas metrische Vita Sancti Cuthberti (1935).

Life of St. Cuthbert (prose)

Bede wrote two lives of St Cuthbert; this one is in prose and was composed in about 721. It is in part based on an earlier life of St Cuthbert, anonymous but probably written by a monk of Lindisfarne.

Martyrology

Description: Bede probably wrote this between 725 and 731.
Latin titles: Described in Bede's list as Martyrologium de nataliciis sanctorum martyrum diebus; in quo omnes, quos invenire potui, non-solum qua die, verum etiam quo genere certaminis, vel sub quo iudice mundum vicerint, diligenter adnotare studui.
Editions:

History
Ecclesiastical History of the English People

Description: A history of the founding and growth of the English church, from the mission of Augustine of Canterbury to Bede's day.  Includes a short introductory section on the history of Britain prior to Augustine's mission.
Latin titles: Described in Bede's list as Historiam ecclesiasticam nostrae insulae ac gentis in libris V. Generally known as Historia ecclesiastica gentis Anglorum.
Editions:
 
 

Ecclesiastical History of the English People (Old English version)

Description: An Old English version of Bede's Ecclesiastical History.
Latin titles: Described in Bede's list as Historiam ecclesiasticam nostrae insulae ac gentis in libris V.
Editions:

History of the Abbots of Wearmouth and Jarrow

Description: This was definitely composed after 716, and was probably completed between 725 and 731.
Latin titles: Described in Bede's list as Historiam abbatum monasterii huius, in quo supernae pietati deservire gaudeo, Benedicti, Ceolfridi, et Huaetbercti, in libellis duobus.
Editions:

Homilies
Homilies

Bede's list of his works refers to two books of homilies, and these are preserved.  In addition, innumerable homilies exist that have been attributed to him; in most cases the attribution is spurious but there may be additional homilies of Bede beyond those in the main two books that survive. It is unclear whether the homilies were ever actually preached, or were instead intended for devotional reading.  They are organized around particular dates in the church calendar, with forty of them dealing with either Christmas or Easter.  The remaining ten are concerned with the feast days of saints.  The homilies are thought to be among Bede's later works, dating perhaps to the late 720s.  Thirty-four of them were included in a widely disseminated anthology of readings put together in Charlemagne's reign by Paul the Deacon.  It is possible that Bede composed these homilies to complement the work of Gregory the Great, who had assembled his own collection of homilies: the two sets of homilies only have one reading in common, and that reading is one which Gregory had indicated needed further attention.

Letters
Bede lists five letters in the list he gives of his works in the Historia Ecclesiastica, as follows: "Item librum epistolarum ad diversos: quarum de sex aetatibus saeculi una est; de mansionibus filiorum Israhel una; una de eo quod ait Isaias; 'et claudentur ibi in carcerem et post dies multos visitabantur'; de ratione bisexti una; de aequnioctio iuxta Anatolium una".  Two additional letters are known: the letter to Albinus he wrote to accompany a copy of the Historia Ecclesiastica, and the Epistle to Egbert. The first five letters below are the ones Bede mentioned; they are given in the same order that Bede describes them.

Letter to Plegwin

One of Bede's works on chronology, De temporibus, led to him being accused of heresy in front of Wilfred, the bishop of York; Bede was not present but heard of the charge from a monk named Plegwin.  This letter is Bede's response to Plegwin; he justifies his work and asks Plegwin to deliver the letter to a monk named David so that it could be read to Wilfred.  The letter was first published in Dublin in 1664 by Sir James Ware. Five manuscripts survive.

Letter to Acca: "de eo quod ait Isaias"

This letter was first published in 1843 by J. A. Giles, in his edition of the complete works of Bede.  Giles used the only known manuscript, Paris B.N. 2840.

Letter to Acca: "de mansionibus filiorum Israhel"

As with the previous letter to Acca, the first publication was in J.A. Giles' 1843 edition of Bede's works.  There are two manuscripts of this letter; it appears in Paris B.N. 2840, and also in a manuscript now in Zurich.

Letter to Helmwald

Bede's letter to Helwmald was published in 1980 in the CCSL series, edited by C.W. Jones.  An English translation by Faith Wallis appeared in 1999.

Letter to Wicthede

Bede's letter to Wicthede was first printed in Hervagius's 1563 folio editions of Bede's works, but the manuscript Hervagius used included a reference to the year 776.  It was argued on this basis that the letter was not by Bede, but subsequently a comparison with other manuscripts determined that the passage was a spurious interpolation, and the letter is now accepted as genuine. Many manuscripts are now known; Laistner lists over thirty.

Letter to Albinus

Bede wrote this short letter to Albinus, the abbot of the monastery of St Peter and St Paul in Canterbury, to thank him for providing documents to Bede to assist him in writing the Ecclesiastical History.  With the letter Bede sent a copy of his De templo Salomonis, and also a copy of the History; the date of the letter is therefore after 731, when the History was completed.  The letter was sent to Albinus in the hands of Nothhelm, a London priest who subsequently became Archbishop of Canterbury. The text was first published by Jean Mabillon in his Vetera Analecta, which began publication in 1675. Mabillon used a manuscript from the monastery of St Vincent in Metz which has since been lost. The text survives in two twelfth-century manuscripts from Austria: London, British Library, Add. 18329 (from St. Georgenberg-Fiecht), and Göttweig, Stiftsbibliothek, 37 (rot).

Letter to Egbert

This letter is not included in Bede's list of his own writings. Bede completed the letter on 5 November 734, not long before his death on 26 May 735; in it he explains that he is unable to visit Egbert, as he had the previous year, and so is writing to him instead. The letter contains Bede's complaints about what he saw as the errors of the ecclesiastics of his day, including monasteries that were religious in name only, ignorant and careless clergy, and a lack of monastic discipline. Egbert was Bishop of York at the time Bede wrote to him; he was raised to the archbishopric later that year, and Bede was probably aware of his impending elevation. The letter was first published in Dublin in 1664 by Sir James Ware, using Harley 4688, a manuscript now in the British Museum.

Hymns and poems
In Bede's list of his works, he describes a book of hymns: "Librum hymnorum diverso metro sive rhythmo" and a book of poems: "Librum epigrammatum heroico metro sive elegiaco".  Although manuscripts by these names survived to the 15th century, none are extant today.  However, some of Bede's verse was transmitted through other manuscripts. In addition, Bede included poems in several of his prose works, and these have occasionally been copied separately and thus transmitted independently of their parent work.

Hymns

Only one hymn is definitely by Bede; his Hymn on Queen Etheldryd, which is part of his Historia Ecclesiastica but which appears independently in some manuscripts.  An additional fifteen hymns are thought to be of Bede's composition.  Thirteen of these now survive only in a 16th-century printed edition; two further hymns, on psalms XLI and CXXII, have survived in manuscript form.

De die iudicii

The poem De die iudicii is assigned to Bede by most scholars.

Liber epigrammatum

Bede refers to a book of epigrams; the work is not entirely lost but has survived only in fragments. In the early 16th century, the antiquary John Leland transcribed a selection of epigrams from a now-lost manuscript; his selection includes several epigrams attributed to Bede which are likely to have come from the book Bede refers to.  Leland's source was originally owned by Milred, bishop of Worcester from 745 to 775.  Historian Michael Lapidge suggests that Milred's collection of epigrams was assembled early in Milred's tenure as bishop, perhaps in about 750.

Bede's Death Song

Cuthbert's letter on Bede's death, the Epistola Cuthberti de obitu Bedae, is understood to indicate that Bede also composed a five line vernacular poem known to modern scholars as Bede's Death Song

Other poems

The only other surviving poem of Bede's that is not part of one of Bede's prose works is a prayer in thirteen elegiac couplets which survives in a tenth-century manuscript in garbled form; it was first printed correctly in 1912.

School treatises
Bede describes two of his school treatises in his list of works as "Item librum de metrica arte et huic adiectum alium de schematibus sive tropis libellum, hoc est de figuris modisque locutionum, quibus scriptura sancta contexta est". The first is "a book on the art of poetry", and the second is a "little book of tropes and figures; that is, of the figures and manners of speaking in which the Holy Scriptures are written". The majority of extant manuscripts of these treatises contain both of them.

De arte metrica

Description: This first part is a treatise on Latin metre and prosody, consisting of verse examples with commentary. Having stressed the distinction between letters (litterae, which he leaves for discussion in the second part De schematibus et tropis) and syllables (syllabae), Bede explains the rules of syllabic quantity and the way these apply to metrical patterns. Bede's treatise can be compared with De metris and De pedum regulis by Aldhelm, whose educational approach is more theoretical and mathematical than Bede's and less focused on actual practice. In the event, it was Bede's treatise rather than those of Aldhelm which became the popular textbook until the Renaissance period.
Latin titles: De Arte Metrica; also known, more rarely, as De Metrica Ratione.
Editions:
ed. C.W. Jones. Bedae opera didascalica. CCSL 123A. 3 vols. Turnhout: Brepols, 1975. 59–141.

De schematibus et tropis

Description: This second part is a shorter treatise, including an alphabetic overview of letters (litterae) and their importance to scansion.
Latin titles:
Editions: Kendall (ed.), CCSL 123A (1975): 81–171; Kendall (ed. and tr.), Libri II De arte metrica et De schematibus et tropis: The Art of Poetry and Rhetoric (1991). Recently, the fragment of a pre-Conquest English copy has been noted in the 11th-century manuscript Worcester Cathedral MS Q.5, which was not used by Kendall in his edition of the work.

De orthographia

Description:
Latin titles:
Editions:

Scientific treatises

De natura rerum

Bede completed De natura rerum shortly after De temporibus, which was written in 703. The work is modelled on the De natura rerum of Isidore of Seville.

De temporibus

This work was completed in 703.  It contains a short chronicle which was sometimes copied separately, known as the Chronica minora.  There are also manuscripts of De temporibus which omit the chronicle. It is a treatise covering the basics of the computus, the medieval study of calculating the correct dates for the Christian calendar. Bede used much material from Isidore of Seville's Etymologies for this work.

De temporum ratione

This work was completed in 725.  It contains a chronicle which was often copied separately, known as the Chronica maiora.  There are also manuscripts of De temporum ratione which omit the chronicle. The work was known to medieval readers as De temporibus, but since that was also the title of an earlier work by Bede it was also referred to as De temporibus liiber secundus. Like De temporibus it deals with computus, but at much greater length.  Bede's treatment of the topic was widely and rapidly disseminated during the Middle Ages; over one hundred manuscripts have survived to the present day, almost half of which were copied within a century of the work's composition. This may be because Charlemagne instituted educational reforms that included making computus part of the curriculum.

Doubtful works
De octo quaestionibus

According to Eric Knibbs, the treatise entitled the De octo quaestionibus is a 12th-century creation that cannot be ascribed to Bede, though the eight individual texts gathered under this title are much older. A subset of four (called, in some manuscripts, the Solutiones) are almost certainly Bede's; the authorship of the other four is uncertain.

Patrologia Latina vol. 94 includes a number of homiliae subdititiae "spurious homilies" attributed to Bede.

The so-called Paenitentiale Bedae, a disciplinary work composed between c. 700 and 800, may have been authored by Bede. The idea that Bede wrote a penitential has been accepted as uncontroversial by both medieval and modern scholars, including Hermann Wasserschleben, Bruno Albers and J.T. McNeill. Others, however, including Charles Plummer and M.L.W. Laistner, have challenged the attribution of this work to Bede on the grounds that Bede (they say) was too high-minded and too talented a Latinist to have composed a work of such stylistic simplicity treating such vulgar subjects as drinking, physical violence and sexual deviance. A.J. Frantzen has adopted an agnostic attitude, acknowledging several arguments for and against Bedan authorship that taken together seem to leave the matter presently unanswerable. The most recent and detailed study of the text was carried out by Reinhold Haggenmüller, who pronounced definitively against Bedan authorship; however, Haggenmüller's argument against Bedan authorship is hardly persuasive (it amounts merely to noticing that the oldest manuscript dates to about 60 years after Bede's death). In fact no scholar has yet been able to adduce concrete evidence that either confirms or denies Bedan authorship of the Paenitentiale Bedae. McNeill and Gamer's summary of the problem is still perhaps the most fair and concise:

The fact that no penitential is included by Bede among the works he lists at the end of his Ecclesiastical History ... as of the years 702–31 can hardly be admitted as a conclusive argument against his having written one, in view of the omission from this list of a number of his other known works. The strongest objection to his authorship of this book is the lack of distinction and originality in the work itself. But the author may have intended a revision, which he did not live to make. Probably too, we should not expect to find the marks of genius in a penitential. The nature of these handbooks excludes sublimity.

Editions of the Latin text and translations into English
The following table gives the first publication of each of Bede's works listed above, and also lists a modern edition of the text and a modern translation where available.  The table states "None" only where it is definitely known that no printed edition or translation exists.

Complete works
Opera Bedae Venerabilis Presbyteri Anglosaxonis (Hervagius, Basel 1563).
 Opera Bedae Venerabilis Presbyteri, Anglosaxonis: Viri in Diuinis atque Humanis Literis Exercitatissimi: omnia in octo tomos distincta (Basileae: Joannes Hervagius 1563).
 Venerabilis Bedae Anglo-Saxonis Presbyteri in Omni Disciplinarum Genere Sua Aetate Doctissimi Operum Tomi VIII (Colonia Agrippina: Antonius Hieratus & Ioannes Gymnicus 1612).
 Venerabilis Bedae Presbyteri Anglo-Saxonis, Doctoris Ecclesiae Vere Illuminati, Opera... in Tomos VIII (Coloniae Agrippinae: apud Ioannem Wilhelmum Friessem juniorem 1688).

The first attempt to print a complete set of Bede's works was made in 1563 by Johannes Hervagius (Johann Herwagen the younger, died 1564), a printer of Basle, completing a project begun by his father (died 1557). This, which is taken as the Editio princeps, followed upon the first extended edition of Bede's Commentaries, edited by Franciscus Jametius, printed at Paris in three volumes in 1544, other works being available in separate editions.

The royal privilege of the first edition was granted by King Henry II of France to Bernard Brand, partner of Hervagius, in 1558, and re-granted to Hervagius the younger by Charles IX in 1561. (The latter was during the regency of Catherine de' Medici in the months preceding the Colloquy of Poissy.) In his Preface Ad Lectorem Hervagius credits Jacobus Pamelius with the assembly of texts and a significant role in their editing. The entire edition was dedicated to Marquard, Freiherr von Hattstein, Prince-Bishop of Speyer (1560-1581) and provost of the collegiate church of Weissenburg, Alsace. The Epistola Nuncupatoria remarks that Hervagius had met the cost of the edition more for religious reasons than from expectations of financial return: the pure and uncorrupt doctrines of Bede offered the most useful and weighty answers to the explanation of controversies flourishing in their own times.

Hervagius's edition, in eight folio volumes, was incomplete in some respects and included works that were later determined to be spuriously assigned to Bede. For example, the folio edition (following Jametius) includes a commentary on St Paul that is not by Bede (attributed by Mabillon to Florus of Lyon), and omits the commentary that Bede wrote. A full contents listing appears in the prefatory material to Volume 1. A newly re-set edition was printed at Cologne in 1612, also in eight volumes, following the same order of texts. A further revised edition was printed at Cologne in 1688. Casimir Oudin's commentary on the authenticity of the textual attributions to Bede in these editions was published in 1722, and was reproduced by Migne.

Corpus Christianorum, Series Latina.  The following volumes of this series contain works by Bede:
Vol. 118A (1967): Opera Exegetica.  Ed. C.W. Jones.  Contains Libri quatuor in principium Genesis usque ad nativitatem Isaac et eiectionem Ismahelis adnotationum.
Vol. 119A (1969): Opera Exegetica.  Ed.D. Hurst.  Contains De tabernaculo, De templo and In Ezram et Neemiam.
Vol. 119B (1983): Opera Exegetica.  Ed.D. Hurst, J.E. Hudson.  Contains  In Tobiam, In Proverbia, In Cantica canticorum, and In Habacuc.
Vol. 120 (1960): Opera Exegetica.  Ed.D. Hurst. In Lucae evangelium expositio, and In Marci evangelium expositio. .
Vol. 121 (1983): Opera Exegetica.  Ed. M.L.W. Laistner, D. Hurst.  Contains Expositio Actuum apostolorum, Retractatio in Actus apostolorum, Nomina regionum atque locorum de Actibus apostolorum, and In epistulas VII catholicas.
Vol. 121A (2001): Opera Exegetica.  Ed. R. Gryson.  Contains Expositio Apocalypseos.
Vol. 123A (1975): Opera Didascalica. Eds. C.W. Jones, C.B. Kendall, M.H. King, C.W. Jones.  Contains De orthographia,  De arte metrica et de schematibus et tropis, and De natura rerum.
Vol. 123B (1977): Opera Didascalica.  Ed. C.W. Jones.  Contains De temporum ratione.
Vol. 123C (1980): Opera Didascalica.  Ed. C.W. Jones, C.W. Jones.  Contains Magnus circulus seu tabula paschalis, Kalendarium sive Martyrologium, De temporibus liber, and Epistolae (ad Pleguinam, ad Helmwaldum, ad Wicthedum).
Vol. 175 (1965): Itineraria et alia geographica. Eds. P. Geyer, O. Cuntz, A.. Francheschini, R. Weber, L. Bieler, J. Fraipont, F.. Glorie. Contains De locis sanctis, éd. J. Fraipont

Patrologia Latina.  Volumes 90–94 of this series contain works by Bede, as follows.
 J.-P. Migne (ed.), Venerabilis Bedae Anglosaxonis Presbyteri Opera Omnia ex tribus praecipuis editionibus inter se collatis, 5 volumes (Patrologia Latina Vols 90–94), (Migne, Paris 1850).
Vol. 90 (Bede 1): Opera didascalica, containing
De ortographia liber
De arte metrica
De schematis et tropis sacrae scripturae
De natura rerum
De temporibus
De ratione temporum
De ratione computi
De celebratione Paschae
De ordinatione feriarum Paschalium
De Tonitruis
Vol. 91 (Bede 2): Opera exegetica (Inceptio)
Hexaemeron, sive libri quatuor in principium Genesis usque ad nativitatem Isaac et electionem Ismaelis
Commentarii in Pentateuchum
De Tabernaculo et Vasis ejus, ac Vestibus Sacerdotum libri tres
Expositionis allegoricae in Samuelem prophetam libri quatuor
In Libros Regum quaestiones XXX
Liber de Templo Salomonis
In Esdram et Nehemiam allegoricae Expositionis libri tres
Interpretatio in librum Tobiae
Expositio in Parabolas Salomonis
Libellus de Muliere forti
In Proverbia Salomonis interpretationis fragmenta
Expositionis in Cantica canticorum libri septem
Expositio in Canticum Habacuc
Vol. 92 (Bede 3): Opera exegetica genuina (Continuatio)
Expositio in Evangelium S. Matthaei
Expositio in Evangelium S. Marci
Expositio in Evangelium S. Lucae
Expositio in Evangelium S. Joannis
Expositio in Actus Apostolorum
De nominibus Locorum vel Civitatum quae leguntur in libro Actuum
Vol. 93 (Bede 4): 
Pars Secunda 
Sectio 1 – Opera exegetica genuina (Conclusio)
Expositio super Epistolas catholicas
Explanatio Apocalypsis
Sectio 2 – Dubia et Spuria
Vol. 94 (Bede 5):
Pars Tertia: Opera Paraenetica
Sectio I: Homiliae
Homiliae genuinae
Homiliae subdititiae
Sectio II: Ascetica
Libellus precum
De Officiis Libellus ex quorumdam Patrum dictis excerptus
Excerptiones Patrum, Collectanea, Flores ex diversis, Quaestiones et Parabolae
De Meditatione Passionis Christi per septem diei horas
De Remediis peccatorum
Sectio III: Carmina
Vita metrica S. Cuthberti Lindisfarnensis episcopi
Passio S. Justini Martyris
Martyrologium poeticum
Hymni tredecim
Pars Quarta: Opera Historica
Sectio 1: Hagiographica
Vita SS. Abbatum monasterii in Wiramutha et Gircum Benedicti, Ceolfridi, Easteruini, Sigfridi et Hwaetbercti
Vita prosaica S. Cuthberti Lindisfarnensis episcopi
Vita B. Felicis confessoris
Sectio 2: Martyrologia
Martyrologia juxta exemplaria Coloniense et Bollandianum
Appendices quatuor ad Martyrologia
I. Kalendarium Anglicanum, sive libellus annalis Ven. Bedae
II. Necrologium insertum Ven. Bedae Martyrologio
III. Chronicon breve a mundi exordio usque ad annum Christi DCCCX, ex vetusto codice ms. Bedae de Ratione temporum, qui fuit ecclesiae seu monasterii Sancti Dionysium Francia.
De Locis Sanctis Libellus, quem de opusculus majorum abbreviando Beda composuit

Notes

References
Bede, Ecclesiastical History of the English People. Translated by Leo Sherley-Price, revised R.E. Latham, ed. D.H. Farmer. London: Penguin, 1990.

External links
Patrologia Latina, Documenta Catholica Omnia.

Latin texts of Anglo-Saxon England
Bibliographies by writer
Bibliographies of British writers
Christian bibliographies